The Texas Theatre is a movie theater and Dallas landmark located in the Oak Cliff neighborhood of Dallas, Texas. It gained historical significance on November 22, 1963, as the location of Lee Harvey Oswald's arrest over the suspicion he was the killer of Dallas Police Officer J. D. Tippit. Today, it hosts a mix of repertory cinema and special events.

History
When first opened, fittingly on the anniversary day of Texas independence in 1931, the Texas Theatre was the largest suburban movie theater in Dallas and was part of a chain of theaters financed by Howard Hughes. It was the first theater in Dallas with air conditioning and featured many state-of-the-art luxuries.

The theater is most famous for being the site of Lee Harvey Oswald's arrest on November 22, 1963. Warren "Butch" Burroughs, manager, and concession stand attendee the afternoon of Oswald's arrest said that Oswald came into the theater between 1:00 and 1:07 pm. Burroughs further claimed he sold Oswald popcorn at 1:15 p.m. Julie Postal, the ticket seller, who was posted out in front of the entrance told the Warren Commission that Burroughs initially told her the same thing, although when she later discussed the event with him, she became skeptical about his version. Julia Postal, however never saw Oswald enter the theater, relying on the account of Johnny Calvin Brewer, a manager at Hardy's Shoe Store's, which according to the official government report, happened at 1:35 p.m.. Texas Theatre patron, Jack Davis, also corroborated Burroughs' time, claiming he observed Oswald in the theatre prior to 1:20 pm. The films presented that day were Cry of Battle and War Is Hell, which Oswald briefly viewed.

As a commemoration of the historic capture, the words "Lee Harvey Oswald, November 22, 1963" were later inscribed in gold paint on the chair Oswald (supposedly) occupied — three rows from the rear, five seats from the aisle. However, the actual chair was removed by then manager "Butch" Burroughs, who took it home and replaced it with another which the FBI confiscated the next day for evidence thinking it was the original Oswald seat.

The theater closed in 1989 and the Texas Theatre Historical Society (TTHS) purchased it the following year. This allowed Oliver Stone to remodel the exterior façade for his 1991 film, JFK. However, by 1992, the Society was no longer able to fund the property and the theater closed again. Former usher and sign changer Don Dubois of Texas Rosewin-Midway Properties saved the theater from the wrecking ball in 1993, but two years later, it was nearly destroyed by a five-alarm fire, forcing another closure. In 1996, Pedro Villa stepped in to rescue the theater from another plan which would have demolished the structure and replaced it with a furniture warehouse. However, he was unable to obtain financing to restore the theater and it defaulted to Texas Rosewin-Midway Properties. The fire-damaged building remained vacant for three years, open to vandals, stray animals, and the elements.

In 2001, the Oak Cliff Foundation acquired the structure and began renovations after receiving $1.6 million from the Dallas Neighborhood Renaissance Partnership. Since then, the board of the Oak Cliff Foundation has raised an additional $2 million of the estimated $9 million needed for the complete renovation of the theater. The foundation used the funds to secure and restore the building needed after years of neglect and fire damage and the venue began hosting movies and special events soon after.

In September 2010, Aviation Cinemas, Inc. signed a lease to operate the theater as an independent and repertory cinema with hopes of presenting live theatre and concerts in the future.

In November 2017, a historical marker was installed in front of the theatre which read "On November 22, 1963, following the assassination of President John F. Kennedy, Lee Harvey Oswald was apprehended in the auditorium".

See also

National Register of Historic Places listings in Dallas County, Texas
Recorded Texas Historic Landmarks in Dallas County
List of Dallas Landmarks

References

External links

History of the Texas Theatre

Theatre in Dallas
History of Dallas
Cinemas and movie theaters in Texas
Buildings and structures associated with the assassination of John F. Kennedy
Buildings and structures in Dallas
National Register of Historic Places in Dallas
Dallas Landmarks
Repertory cinemas
1931 establishments in Texas
Theatres on the National Register of Historic Places in Texas
Art Deco architecture in Texas